Toomas Kivisild (born 11 August 1969, in Tapa, Estonia) is an Estonian population geneticist. He graduated as a biologist and received his PhD in Genetics, from University of Tartu, Estonia, in 2000. Since then he has worked as a postdoctoral research fellow in the School of Medicine, at Stanford University (2002-3), Estonian Biocentre (since 2003), as the Professor of Evolutionary Biology, University of Tartu (2005-6), and as a Lecturer and Reader in Human Evolutionary Genetics in the Department of Archaeology and Anthropology at the University of Cambridge (2006-2018). From 2018 he is a professor in the Department of Human Genetics at KU Leuven and a senior researcher at the Institute of Genomics, University of Tartu.

Kivisild has focused in his research on questions relating global genetic population structure with evolutionary processes such as selection, drift, migrations and admixture. He coauthored the second edition of the textbook Human Evolutionary Genetics (2013).

Selected publications
1999a. "Deep common ancestry of Indian and western-Eurasian mitochondrial DNA lineages" 
1999b. "The Place of the Indian mtDNA Variants in the Global Network of Maternal Lineages and the Peopling of the Old World" 
2000a. "An Indian Ancestry: a Key for Understanding Human Diversity in Europe and Beyond" 
2000b. "The origins of southern and western Eurasian populations: an mtDNA study" 
2003a. "The Genetics of Language and Farming Spread in India"  
2003b. "The Genetic Heritage of the Earliest Settlers Persists Both in Indian Tribal and Caste Populations" , 
The emerging limbs and twigs of the East Asian mtDNA tree.  
 
 
 2005a. Different population histories of the Mundari- and Mon-Khmer-speaking Austro-Asiatic tribes inferred from the mtDNA 9-bp deletion/insertion polymorphism in Indian populations 
 2005b. Reconstructing the Origin of Andaman Islanders 
 2005c. Tracing Modern Human Origins 
 2006a. Response to Comment on‘‘Reconstructing the Origin of Andaman Islanders’’ 
 2006b. 
 2006c. The role of selection in the evolution of human mitochondrial genomes. 
 2007. Peopling of South Asia: investigating the caste-tribe continuum in India 
2007. Revealing the prehistoric settlement of Australia by Y chromosome and mtDNA analysis

References

External links
Google Scholar Search

Population geneticists
Recent African origin of modern humans
1969 births
Living people
Estonian geneticists
Paleogeneticists
People from Tapa, Estonia
University of Tartu alumni
People associated with the University of Cambridge